Svilaja is a mountain range in Croatia, in the Dalmatian Hinterland.

It is part of the Dinaric Alps and stretches from the town of Sinj northwest to the Petrovo field, approximately 30 km in length. The highest peak is Svilaja or Bat at 1508 m.a.s.l. Some of other northwest peaks are Jančak (1483 m), Kita (1413 m), Turjača (1340 m), and Lisina (1301 m) which closest to the town of Vrlika.

From nearest mountain cliff Veliki Kozjak (1207 m), which is northwest continuation of Svilaja, it is separated by the saddle called Lemeš (860 m) above the village of Maovice.

The Bat summit offers beautiful vistas of the Adriatic Sea, Peruća lake, and mountain ranges farther in Bosnia and Herzegovina. The summit is easily approachable from southeast, either by following an unpaved road from Donje Ogorje or by taking the marked trail from Orlove Stine mountain lodge. Northern parts of the mountain are deemed dangerous because of the mines left during the Croatian War of Independence.

See also 
 List of mountains in Croatia

References

Mountain ranges of Croatia
Landforms of Split-Dalmatia County